Mary Kay Adams (born September 12, 1962) is an American actress known for her roles in television. 

In a career that spanned from the mid-1980s to 2000, she had several roles on daytime television. Her most high profile role was as jet-setting India von Halkein on Guiding Light. She also played Na'Toth in the second season of the science fiction television series Babylon 5.

Adams grew up in Middletown Township, New Jersey and graduated from Mater Dei High School in 1979. She attended Emerson College, where she was a sister of Sigma Pi Theta and graduated with a Bachelor of Fine Arts.

Other appearances include Star Trek: Deep Space Nine as Grilka, in the episodes "The House of Quark" and "Looking for par'Mach in All the Wrong Places".

Theatrical credits include a seven-month run in the play Tamara and later appeared in the off-Broadway production Program for Murder.

Filmography

Films
The Muppets Take Manhattan (1984) (uncredited)
See No Evil, Hear No Evil (1989) ... Dr. Bennett
Born Yesterday (1993) ... Girl (uncredited)
Satan's Little Helper (2004) ... Fran

Television
Guiding Light (1984–1987, 1990, 1998–1999, 2002, 2004, 2005) ... India von Halkein 
All My Children (2003) ... Mrs. Lacey
Disney Presents The 100 Lives of Black Jack Savage (1991) ... Marla Lance
Jake and the Fatman (1992)
As the World Turns (1992–1993) ... Neal Keller Alcott
One Life to Live (1992) ... Death
Babylon 5 (1994–1995) ... Na'Toth
Land's End (1995) ... Mildred
Fast Company (1995)
The John Larroquette Show (1996) ... Bunny Abelson
Dark Skies (1996) ... Alicia Bainbridge
Star Trek: Deep Space Nine (1994, 1996) ... Grilka
Everybody Loves Raymond (1997) ... Dr. Nora
Diagnosis: Murder (1997) ... Vanessa Sinclair
Third Watch (1999)
Law & Order (2000) ... Nancy Alvarez

References

External links 
 
 

1962 births
Actresses from New Jersey
American film actresses
American soap opera actresses
American television actresses
Living people
Mater Dei High School (New Jersey) alumni
People from Middletown Township, New Jersey
Emerson College alumni
20th-century American actresses
21st-century American actresses